Kilbride is a defunct provincial electoral district for the House of Assembly of Newfoundland and Labrador, Canada. As of 2011, there are 10,251 eligible voters living within the district. The district was abolished in 2015 and replaced by Waterford Valley.

The district made up the southern portion of the city of St. John's, including the rural neighbourhoods of the Goulds and Kilbride. Agriculture was an important industry in the district.

It was one of the strongest Progressive Conservative (PC) districts in the Newfoundland and Labrador, voting 85% for the Torys in the 2007 election. Since its creation, it had always returned a PC MHA to the House of Assembly.

Members of the House of Assembly
The district has elected the following Members of the House of Assembly:

Election results 

|-

|-
 
|NDP
|Paul Boundridge
|align="right"|1,927
|align="right"|33.64%
|align="right"|
|-

|}

|-

|-
 
|NDP
|Michelle Broderick
|align="right"|421
|align="right"|8.01%
|align="right"|
|-

|-

|Independent
|Paul Perrier
|align="right"|31
|align="right"|0.59%
|align="right"|
|}

 
|Progressive Conservative
|John Dinn
|align="right"|2,744
|align="right"|78.83
|align="right"|+0.55
|-

|-
 
| style="width: 130px" |NDP
|Gemma Schlamp-Hickey
|align="right"|229
|align="right"|6.58
|align="right"|+0.63
|- bgcolor="white"
!align="left" colspan=3|Total
!align="right"|3,481
!align="right"|100%
!align="right"|
|}

|-

|-

|-
 
|NDP
|David Reynolds
|align="right"|404
|align="right"|
|align="right"|
|}

|-

|-

|-
 
|NDP
|Lee Ingram
|align="right"|289
|align="right"|
|align="right"|
|-

|Independent
|Vicki Stuckless
|align="right"|289
|align="right"|
|align="right"|
|}

References

External links 
Website of the Newfoundland and Labrador House of Assembly

Newfoundland and Labrador provincial electoral districts
Politics of St. John's, Newfoundland and Labrador